Leaving Home at Eighteen (十八岁出门远行, or 十八歲出 門遠行 Shíbā Suì Chūmén Yuǎnxíng) is a short story by Yu Hua. It is also commonly referred to as "On the Road at Eighteen".

Plot
The narrator of the story is on a road traveling by foot, searching for an inn.  The people in the previous hamlet had told him to keep walking until he found one. But he has been walking for hours and is starting to worry.  He thinks about flagging down a car, but he has not seen one for hours.  He thinks he would even flag one down going the opposite direction.  He eventually finds a broken down apple truck by the side of the road, and after offering the driver a cigarette, manages to hitch a ride.  The truck driver is reluctant at first, but the two become fast friends.  But then the truck breaks down again.

Men on bikes arrive not to help but to pilfer the apples.  The narrator tries to stop them, accusing them of robbing the driver. Instead of listening, the thieves beat him up. The driver does nothing.  This happens again when more people come.  Eventually, the narrator lies by the side of the road bleeding as he watches the driver scurry off carrying the narrator's own backpack.  The story concludes with the narrator finally crawling into the cab of the truck to find warmth as the night settles down. He remembers his father's admonition to get out and see the world.

References
http://www.people.com.cn/BIG5/wenyu/66/133/20030318/946231.html

1987 short stories
Short stories by Yu Hua